Elmshorn is a town in the district of Pinneberg in Schleswig-Holstein in Germany. It is 30 km north of Hamburg on the small river Krückau, a tributary of the Elbe, and with about 50,000 inhabitants is the sixth-largest town in the state of Schleswig-Holstein, Germany. It is the birthplace of writer and editor Hermann Schlüter (1851–1919), the mathematician Hermann Weyl (1885–1955) and the medievalist Heinz Woehlk (1944- ).

Economy and industry
Historically Elmshorn had many companies in the food industry. Including meat processing and sausage production, margarine production and cereal processing.  Major surviving companies include Dölling-Hareico (meat processing/sausage production) and Kölln (cereal processing, mainly oats and muesli).

Twin towns – sister cities

Elmshorn is twinned with:
 Tarascon, France (1987)
 Wittenberge, Germany (1990)
 Stargard, Poland (1993)  
 Raisio, Finland (2000)

Notable people
The following people were born in Elmshorn (in order of year of birth):
 Johann Christoph Biernatzki (1795–1840), writer
 Johannes Rehmke (1848–1930), philosopher
 Fritz Höger (1877–1949), (born in Bekenreihe near Elmshorn), architect
 Hermann Weyl (1885–1955), mathematician
 Wilhelm Mohr (1885–1969), politician, member of the CDU
 Carl August Rathjens (1887–1966), geographer
 Wilhelm Peetz (1892–1935), communist and resistance fighter against national socialism
 Harald Paulsen (1895–1954), actor and director
 Karsten Voigt (born 1941), politician and member of the SPD
  (born 1959), Cultural Prize 2002, graphic artist and object artist
  (born 1962), singer and one-hit wonder
 Michael Stich (born 1968), tennis player (grew up in Elmshorn)
 Tim Mälzer (born 1971), cook and author of cookery books
 Chiara Schoras (born 1975), actress
 Hanno Behrens (born 1990), soccer player

See also
Kooperative Gesamtschule Elmshorn

References

External links
 
Elmshorner Nachrichten (Local Newspaper) 

Pinneberg (district)